(or also "Three Great Secret Dharmas") are the fundamental teachings in Nichiren Buddhism, which include Hommon-no-honzon (本門の本尊: object of devotion of the essential teaching), Hommon-no-kaidan  (本門の戒壇: sanctuary of the essential teaching), and Hommon-no-daimoku （本門の題目: daimoku of the essential teaching).

The interpretations of each item are different by each school of Nichiren's teachings, such as Nichiren shu sects, Nichiren shoshu sects, Soka Gakkai branches.

(The table is summarized from the texts by each sect)

Further reading 
・The collections of Nichiren's writings by each sect 
 
・Nichikan (1725). Rokkan-shō (Six-Volume Writings) 

・Montgomery, Daniel (1991). Fire In The Lotus. London: Mand ala (Harper Collins). 

・Masatoshi Ueki (1992). Sanju-Hiden-Sho-Ronko (A study on the Sanju-Hiden-Sho) [in Japanese]. Kokoku-Shoin, Tokyo. 

・Zuiei Itou (1992). Sandai hihou bonjouji no keiryoubunkengaku teki shin kenkyu [in Japanese]. Osaki  haku-hou. No. 148 

・Fumihiko Sueki (1999). Nichiren's Problematic Works. Japanese Journal of Religious Studies, Vol. 26(3/4), pp. 261-280

Footnotes

Nichiren Buddhism